Kondwani Kaira (born 23rd May 1986), better known by his stage name Chef 187, is a Zambian hip hop musician, a former Infinix ambassador and former Proflight ambassador from the Copperbelt Province signed under Alpha Entertainments Music. A younger brother of Macky 2.

Career 
Chef 187 first showed interest in music when he was 5 but he only considered it as a career in 2003 after seeing his elder brother Macky 2 become successful in the music industry over the years. In 2005 he recorded his first song. In 2011 he collaborated with Macky 2 his older brother, performing a diss track entitled "I Am Zambian Hip-Hop", targeted at rapper Slap Dee of XYZ entertainment records.

Discography

Albums 
 Bon Appetit - 2019
 Bon Appetit Deluxe - Published: 02/2021
 Amnesia - 2016
 Heart of a Lion - 2014
 Amenso Pamo- 2013
 Broke Nolunkumbwa - 2023

Notable songs 
 "Wala" -2015
 "Kumalila Ngoma" - 2014
 "Foolish me feat P Jay"
 "Big Shofolo" 
 "99 jobs" 
 "Love you"
 "Court session"
 "Complicated" ft. T-Low Badman Alahji
 "Amnesia"
 "Good Teacher Bad Kasukulu" 
 "Mundowe ndowe" ft. Mumba Yachi and Dope G
 "Winning feat Wilz Nyopole"
 "Can't Wait to Tell You I Told you" ft. S Roxy
 "Unbeatable" ft. SRoxy
"Sensei"
"No Minyo Minyo"
"I need you"
"Coordinate" ft Skales
"One more" ft Mr. P
"Never Forget" ft Sampa The Great

Awards 
 2015 - Mainstream Album Award - Heart of a Lion 
 2015 - Best Hip Hop Album - Heart of a Lion
 2015 - Best Mainstream Male Artiste award - Chef 187 
 2015 - Best Collaboration - "Kumalila Ngoma" (Chef 187 ft. Afunika)
 2022- best hip-hop artist of year- kwacha awards(2022)

References

External links 
 

Living people
21st-century Zambian male singers
People from Lusaka
1986 births